Kruševac Sports Hall is an indoor arena in Kruševac. It has a capacity of 2500 people. It is a home arena of basketball team KK Napredak and RK Napredak. Sports Hall was opened in 1977 and renovated in 2013. Sports Hall also has a gymnastics hall "Soko".

See also
List of indoor arenas in Serbia

References

External links
Official website of SC Kruševac

Sport in Kruševac
Indoor arenas in Serbia
Basketball venues in Serbia